Allen Robert Tannenbaum (born January 25, 1953) is an American/Israeli applied mathematician and presently Distinguished Professor of Computer Science and Applied Mathematics & Statistics at the State University of New York at Stony Brook. He is also Visiting Investigator of Medical Physics at Memorial Sloan Kettering Cancer Center in New York City. He has held a number of other positions in the United States, Israel, and Canada including the Bunn Professorship of Electrical and Computer Engineering and Interim Chair, and Senior Scientist at the Comprehensive Cancer Center at the University of Alabama, Birmingham. He received his B.A. from Columbia University in 1973 and Ph.D. with thesis advisor Heisuke Hironaka at the Harvard University in 1976.

Tannenbaum has done research in numerous areas including robust control, computer vision, and biomedical imaging, having almost 500 publications. He pioneered the field of robust control with the solution of the gain margin and phase margin problems using techniques from Nevanlinna–Pick interpolation theory, which was the first H-infinity type control problem solved. Tannenbaum used techniques from elliptic curves to show that the reachability does not imply pole assignability for systems defined over polynomial rings in two or more variables over an arbitrary field. He pioneered the use of partial differential equations in computer vision and biomedical imaging co-inventing with Guillermo Sapiro an affine-invariant heat equation for image enhancement. Tannenbaum further formulated a new approach to optimal mass transport (Monge-Kantorovich) theory in joint work with Steven Haker and Sigurd Angenent. In recent work, he has developed techniques using graph curvature ideas for analyzing the robustness of complex networks.

His work has won several awards including IEEE Fellow in 2008, O. Hugo Schuck Award of the American Automatic Control Council in 2007 (shared with S. Dambreville and Y. Rathi), and the George Taylor Award for Distinguished Research from the University of Minnesota in 1997. He has given numerous plenary talks at major conferences including the Society for Industrial and Applied Mathematics (SIAM) Conference on Control in 1998, IEEE Conference on Decision and Control of the IEEE Control Systems Society in 2000, and the International Symposium on the Mathematical Theory of Networks and Systems (MTNS) in 2012. He is also well known as one of the authors of the textbook Feedback Control Theory (with John Doyle and Bruce Francis), which is currently a standard introduction to robust control at the graduate level.

His wife Rina Tannenbaum is a chemist and his son Emmanuel David Tannenbaum was a biophysicist and applied mathematician.

Georgia Tech/Technion employment controversy

In 2011 an audit by Georgia Tech accused professors Allen Tannenbaum and his wife Rina Tannenbaum that they violated Georgia Institute of Technology and State policies by working simultaneously at Georgia Tech and Technion-Israel Institute of Technology. 
The report concluded that the Tannenbaums held tenured positions at both institutions since at least 2005, and they were still employed full time at both universities. The Tannenbaums denied that Georgia Tech was cheated and maintained that they did all the required work. As a result of the investigation, the Tannenbaums repaid Georgia Tech nearly $80,000 in travel expenses and resigned their positions there. They subsequently moved to Boston University.

References

External links 
 Tannenbaum's Home Page
 Feedback Control Theory by Tannenbaum, Doyle and Francis
 
 Tannenbaum's Work on Medical Imaging

1953 births
20th-century American mathematicians
21st-century American mathematicians
Living people
Harvard University alumni
Stony Brook University faculty
Columbia College (New York) alumni